Metak was a Croatian rock band. It was founded in Split, then Yugoslavia, and disbanded in 1981. Their song, "Da Mi Je Biti Morski Pas" (Wish I Were A Shark), was a mega hit, later covered by another Split band, Osmi Putnik, and it also became a movie of the same name. They released two albums, U Tetrapaku (In Tetrapak) and Ratatatatija.

The band was officially formed at the end of 1978 by bassist Mirko Krstičević. The first lineup was Ranko Boban, (singer) Mirko Krstičević, (bass) Matko Jelavić, (drums) and Željko Brodarić Jappa (guitar). After Boban's departure, Brodarić took over vocals and his brother, Zlatko, also joined the band as a guitarist. The band has released 2 studio albums and three singles, Metak disbanded in 1981.

History
The band was formed at the end of November 1978 by bassist Mirko Krstičević. The original lineup were Ranko Boban (singer), Mirko Krstičević (bass), Matko Jelavić (drums), and Željko Brodarić Jappa (guitar). Their first performance was at Split Festival the same year.
In 1978, Metak signed a contract with Diskoton and released two singles, "Šijavica" and "Gastarbajterska." The same year, Ranko Boban left the band to write songs for artists such as Bijelo Dugme., When Boban left the band, Željko Brodarić took over vocal duties and his brother Zlatko joined the band as a guitarist. In 1979, Metak released their first album, U Tetrapaku (In Tetrapak). Their hit single, "Da Mi Je Biti Morski Pas" ("Wish I Were A Shark") was one of the biggest Yugoslavian hits of all time and was later covered by the Split heavy metal band Osmi Putnik. It also became a movie of the same name.
In 1979, they released two new singles, "Ona Ima Svoju Dragu Mamu" and "Revoler," In 1980, Metak were on Bijelo Dugme's Tour in JNA Stadium and at Poljud Stadium.
 
In 1981 they released their last album, Ratatatatija, recorded at Tetrapak studio. Metak disbanded the same year and all members went on to pursue solo projects: Jelavić started a career in pop music, Krstičević started composing for other projects, Brodarić Jappa released a 1982 EP album and worked with other artists including Crvena Jabuka and Magazin, and Brodarić formed Trio Brodarići with his sons.

Legacy 
"Da Mi Je Biti Morski Pas" was ranked No. 55 in YU 100: najbolji albumi jugoslavenske rock i pop Glazbe (YU 100: The Best albums of Yugoslav pop and rock music). The same song was featured on a 1995 Croatia Records compilation album and in the 2012 documentary Libar Miljenko Smoje.

Band members

Members

Classic line-up
 Željko Brodarić Jappa (guitar, vocal)
 Zlatko Brodarić (guitar)
 Mirko Krstičević (bass)
 Matko Jelavić (drum, vocal)

Other members 
 Doris Tomić (keyboard instruments)
 Ranko Boban (vocal, 1978)

Discography

Albums
 U tetrapaku (Jugoton, 1979)
 Ratatatatija (Suzy, 1980)
 Da mi je biti morski pas (Croatia Records, 1995) - compilation

Singles
 Šijavica / Gastarbajterska (Diskoton, 1978)
 Ona ima svoju dragu mamu / Revolver (Jugoton,1979)
 Da mi je biti morski pas / Rock 'n' Roller (Jugoton,1980)

Bibliography
 Petar Janjatović: Ex-YU rock enciklopedija 1960-2006,

References

External links
 Metak – RateYourMusic

Croatian rock music groups
Musical groups established in 1978
Musical groups disestablished in 1981
Yugoslav hard rock musical groups